Mate Mojtić (22 January 1914 – 2 February 1995) was a Croatian rower. He competed in the men's coxless four event at the 1948 Summer Olympics.

References

External links
 

1914 births
1995 deaths
Croatian male rowers
Olympic rowers of Yugoslavia
Rowers at the 1948 Summer Olympics
Rowers from Split, Croatia
Burials at Lovrinac Cemetery